February 2021 North American winter storm can refer to any of six significant winter storms that impacted North America in February 2021:

Nor'easters
January 31 – February 3, 2021 nor'easter – A powerful nor'easter that became one of the most significant blizzards to affect the Northeastern United States since the January 2016 United States blizzard
2021 Super Bowl Sunday nor'easter – A quick-moving nor'easter that later explosively intensified into a powerful storm after moving out into the North Atlantic
February 13–17, 2021 North American winter storm – A major winter storm that brought blizzard and ice storm conditions to portions of the U.S., in addition to triggering an unprecedented amount of winter weather alerts across the Southern U.S.
February 15–20, 2021 North American winter storm – Another significant winter storm that brought additional snowfall and icy conditions across the U.S., soon after a previous winter storm only a few days earlier and affecting many of the same areas, which later moved up the U.S. East Coast becoming a nor'easter

Other storms
February 10–12 and 11–14 ice storms – Two damaging ice storms that affected large portions of the United States